{{Infobox sports rivalry
 | wide                     = yes
 | name                     = War on I-4
 | image                     = War on I-4 Logo.svg
 | team1                     = South Florida Bulls
 | team1logo                     = South Florida Bulls wordmark.svg
 | team2                     = UCF Knights
 | team2logo                     = UCF Knights logo.svg
 | firstmeeting                     = 1971 (baseball)1972 (men's basketball)1973 (women's basketball)1974 (men's soccer, volleyball)1978 (men's tennis)1994 (women's tennis)1998 (women's soccer)2003 (softball)2005 (football)2013 (cross country)2014 (men's golf, women's golf, track and field)2016 (official War on I-4 series)
 | series                     = Baseball: 81–78 South FloridaIn conference: 22–18 UCFMen's Basketball: 27–19 South FloridaIn conference: 14–7 UCFWomen's Basketball: 32–17 South FloridaIn conference: 13–9 South FloridaFootball: 8–6 UCF In conference: 8–2 UCFMen's Soccer:  South FloridaIn conference: 8–5 South FloridaWomen's Soccer:  UCFIn conference: Tied Softball: 20–19 UCFIn conference: 18–10 UCFMen's Tennis: 36–11 South FloridaIn conference: 8–5 South FloridaWomen's Tennis: 20–10 South FloridaIn conference: 7–5 UCFVolleyball: 49–45 South FloridaIn conference: 20–0 UCFTotal:  South Florida<small>Total in conference:  UCF</small>
 | trophy series                     = 5–0 UCF | stadiums                     = South Florida: Raymond James Stadium, Yuengling Center, Corbett Stadium, USF Baseball Stadium, USF Softball StadiumUCF: FBC Mortgage Stadium, Addition Financial Arena, UCF Soccer and Track Stadium John Euliano Park
 | postseason                     = Total:  South FloridaConference Tournaments: Tied Conference Championship Games: Tied  (included in tournament record)NCAA Tournaments: 6–4 South Florida
 | teams involved                     = University of South FloridaUniversity of Central Florida
 | locations                     = Tampa, Florida, (Bulls)Orlando, Florida, (Knights)
 | sports                     = Baseball, Men's Basketball, Women's Basketball, Women's Cross Country, Football, Men's Golf, Women's Golf, Men's Soccer, Women's Soccer, Softball, Men's Tennis, Women's Tennis, Women's Track & Field, Volleyball
}}

The War on I-4 is a college rivalry between the University of Central Florida Knights and University of South Florida Bulls. The rivalry is best known for its college football matchup which originated in a series of football games played from 2005 to 2008 and now takes place on Thanksgiving weekend, the de facto "rivalry weekend" for FBS football. In 2013, when UCF joined the American Athletic Conference, the schools began competing annually in all sports. In 2016, the schools officially adopted the "War on I-4" as an official competition series. Each year, the team with the most wins across all sports receives a gold trophy styled after an Interstate 4 (I-4) road sign with the logos of each school. The winner of the annual football game also receives a similar trophy.

As of February 22, 2023, South Florida holds the all-time series lead for seven of the ten sports in which the schools meet head-to-head: baseball (81–78), men's basketball (27–19), women's basketball (32–17), men's soccer, men's tennis (36–11), women's tennis (20–10) and volleyball (49–45); but UCF disputes the all time records in baseball, women's basketball, men's soccer, and volleyball, claiming the Bulls' records in these sports are 78–77, 29–14, and 47–44, respectively. The only sports where UCF leads the all time head-to-head series are women's soccer, softball (20–19), and football (8–6). UCF leads the all time trophy series 5–0. The Bulls are 6–4 against UCF in NCAA tournament games, making the overall postseason total  in favor of the Bulls.

Names
Starting when the schools first met on the gridiron in 2005, some writers dubbed the rivalry the "War on I-4". When the series resumed in 2013, administrators from both schools named it the "I-4 Corridor Clash". Both names refer to Interstate 4, an interstate highway that runs through both Orlando and Tampa. In 2016, when the schools announced the official competition, they formally adopted the "War on I-4" name.

The name "War on I-4" had previously been used for an arena football rivalry between the Tampa Bay Storm and Orlando Predators from 1992 to 2016. The Storm and Predators were located in the same metropolitan areas as USF and UCF respectively and were two of the most successful franchises in the league, with the Storm winning five Arena Bowls and the Predators winning two. The name became available when the Predators folded following the 2016 season.

Series history

Beginning
The short distance between the schools, combined with their athletic programs concurrent establishment and rise to NCAA Division I helped create a natural rivalry between the two, which only became stronger when both became members of the American Athletic Conference in 2013. The first meeting between the  then-Florida Technological University Knights of the Pegasus (UCF) and the University of South Florida Golden Brahmans that both schools agree happened (USF claims the schools played two baseball games in 1971 that UCF doesn't recognize) was a 1972 men's basketball game in Tampa. The Golden Brahmans won this game, 115–96. Since that game, USF and UCF have begun series against each other in eight or nine other sports, depending on which schools' records are used.

Official War on I-4 rivalry
On September 21, 2016, the morning of the first meeting of the season between the Bulls and Knights with a volleyball game set to take place in Orlando that evening, both athletic departments announced the official recognition of the “War on I-4” rivalry series. The schools compete each school year in 14 sports for bragging rights, with each sports team's record counting equally toward a final tally for each program.

 Trophy 

The winner of each the football competition and the overall competition each year takes possession of a large trophy shaped like the iconic I-4 road sign, which will be displayed on their campus for the following year. Each trophy is similar but has a few key differences. The all-sports trophy has the War on I-4 logo on it and features the score of each season's overall competition. It is also significantly larger than the football trophy. The football trophy is dual-sided, with one side of the trophy reading "Tampa" and featuring USF's logo while the other reads "Orlando" and features UCF's logo. The football trophy also has a large base, which is detachable. The score of each game is featured on the base.

Unlike the Vince Lombardi Trophy or Larry O'Brien Trophy, which are permanently awarded to the victor every year, both the football and overall War on I-4 trophies are traveling trophies which are kept by the winner until the other team wins it.

 Future 
With UCF set to leave the American Athletic Conference for the Big 12 Conference beginning in the 2023–24 school year, it is unclear whether the rivalry series will continue in the current format. It is likely that football in particular will be on hiatus until at least 2028, because that is the next year when both teams have openings in their non-conference schedules. However, USF and UCF will probably continue playing in most if not all other sports, albeit with fewer meetings than they currently have; and the trophy series may be discontinued or put on hold, especially considering the schools will no longer be guaranteed to meet in golf, cross country, or track and field.

Point system
Since September 21, 2016, when the rivalry series was officially established, USF and UCF have scored their competitions in the 14 sports represented at both universities (South Florida is the only one of the two schools to sponsor men's cross country, women's sailing, and men's track & field while UCF is the only one of the two schools to sponsor women's rowing). Each sport is worth 6 total points, meaning the point system typically grants:

 1 point to the winner of each regular season baseball game (6 games per year)
 3 points to the winner of each regular season men's basketball game (2 games per year)
 3 points to the winner of each regular season women's basketball game (2 games per year)
 6 points to the higher finisher at the American Athletic Conference Women's Cross Country Championship
 6 points to the winner of the annual football game
 6 points to the higher finisher at the American Athletic Conference Men's Golf Championship
 6 points to the higher finisher at the American Athletic Conference Women's Golf Championship
 6 points to the winner the each regular season men's soccer match (3 points awarded to each side in the event of a draw)
 6 points to the winner of the annual regular season women's soccer match (3 points awarded to each side in the event of a draw)
 2 points to the winner of each regular season softball game (3 games per year)
 6 points to the winner of the annual regular season men's tennis match.
 6 points to the winner of the annual regular season women's tennis match.
 3 points to the higher finisher at the American Athletic Conference Women's Indoor Track & Field Championship
 3 points to the higher finisher at the American Athletic Conference Women's Outdoor Track & Field Championship
 3 points to the winner of each regular season volleyball match (2 matches per year)
 In the event of a tie in the overall competition, the athletic program that scores higher in the annual NCAA Graduation Success Rate will be awarded 1 extra point and crowned as the champion for that season. In the unlikely event that this is also tied, the series ends as a tie for that season and the previous winner retains the trophy.

In some years the scoring is slightly different. For example, USF and UCF only met once in women's basketball for the 2016–2017 season, so that game was worth all 6 points. In all, there are 84 available points with 43 points required to clinch the title. As mentioned above, only regular season matches are counted toward War on I-4 point totals for the 10 sports in which the teams compete head-to-head, meaning if the Bulls and Knights meet in a conference or NCAA tournament that game doesn't count for War on I-4 competition purposes.

 Trophy series results 
UCF clinched the first academic year's overall title with an AAC women's golf championship on April 18, 2017. The 2016–17 competition ended on May 20 with a 3–2 Knights victory in a baseball game, making the final point total 51 points to 33 points for UCF.

On April 17, 2018, the Knights clinched the overall title for the second consecutive year, again in the AAC women's golf championship. UCF finished second in the event, while USF finished ninth. The series concluded on May 13 with UCF placing higher than USF in the 2018 American Athletic Conference outdoor track and field competition and led to a final series score of 49–35 for UCF.

UCF clinched the overall title for the third straight year on April 7, 2019, with a 5–0 victory in baseball, the earliest clinch in the competition's history. The series concluded on May 12 with UCF placing higher than USF in the American Athletic Conference women's outdoor track and field competition, making the final score 70–14 in favor of the Knights, the largest margin of victory in the competition's history.

The 2019–20 edition ended in March due to spring sports being canceled because of the COVID-19 pandemic. UCF led the series 36–9 at the time of the cancellation[8] and was awarded the victory for the season, even though the schedule was not complete and UCF did not meet the point thresholds for winning in a normal season. This marked UCF's fourth-consecutive win in the War on I-4.

The pandemic also caused the point system to slightly change for the 2020–21 edition of the rivalry. The AAC Women's Indoor Track & Field Championship was canceled, so the higher finisher at the AAC Women's Outdoor Track & Field Championship received 6 points instead of 3. Men's tennis and men's soccer both met twice in the regular season instead of once, so each of these matches counted for 3 points toward the victor's total rather than the usual 6. In addition there were four softball games and eight baseball games instead of the usual three of each, so each game was worth 1.5 and 0.75 points respectively rather than 2. UCF clinched the overall competition for the fourth time on April 17, 2021, with a 5–4 baseball win in Orlando. The point series ended on May 16 when UCF finished one place above USF in the women's outdoor track and field championship, making the total score 59.25–24.75, but the last meeting of the season between the two schools took place on May 30 when USF beat UCF in the 2021 American Athletic Conference baseball tournament championship game, though this did not add to USF's point total as it was a postseason meeting.

For the 2021–22 season, most of the sports reverted back to their usual schedules, with the exception of men's soccer staying at two games per year and baseball changing to six games per year. On April 16, 2022, UCF officially clinched the series for the 2021–22 season, securing the 43 points needed after defeating USF 4–0 in women's tennis.

Football

History

Early plans
Discussions about scheduling a game between the Knights and Bulls began shortly after South Florida fielded its first NCAA Division I-AA team in 1997. Supporters suggested such a rivalry could help generate interest and revenue for both burgeoning teams. The prospect became more serious when the Bulls entered Division I-A in 2001 and was very popular among fans, but as it would be a non-conference series, difficulties arose. UCF had overbooked its future schedules and would have to break commitments. Meanwhile, South Florida officials worried that their young program stood to take in less revenue from a home-and-away series against UCF than it would with an additional home game on the schedule. Serious planning for a series did not commence until 2003.

First games (2005–2008)
By 2003, serious discussions resumed as both schools had joined conferences – South Florida joined Conference USA (C-USA) in 2001, while UCF joined the Mid-American Conference (MAC) in 2002. That year, the schools' athletics directors met and agreed to schedule games for the 2005 and 2006 seasons. Subsequently, South Florida joined the Big East, an Automatic Qualifying conference, in 2005, while UCF joined C-USA the same year. The Bulls won both games, which both drew crowds over 45,000. The series was extended for 2007 and 2008 as part of an agreement with C-USA that the Bulls play a member of the conference annually for five years. South Florida won these games as well, with a 64–12 blowout in 2007 and 31–24 overtime thriller in 2008. South Florida declined to schedule further games in the series, indicating it wished to pursue more competitive and high-profile opponents. During the series hiatus South Florida would go on to play opponents such as Florida, Florida State, Miami, Clemson, and Notre Dame; beating all except for Florida at least once.

The two schools discussed scheduling more games over the next several years, including a failed proposal by South Florida to play at the Citrus Bowl in 2011. In addition, a possible head-to-head matchup at the 2009 St. Petersburg Bowl failed to materialize. Bowl and city officials decided against pitting the two nearby schools, as they preferred at least one distant team so that more  out of town fans would book hotel rooms in the area. UCF instead faced Rutgers in the game.

Renewed series (2013–present)
UCF was admitted to join USF in the Big East Conference in 2011 and was set to begin playing there in the 2013–2014 school year. Conference realignment turned the Big East into the American Athletic Conference prior to the fall 2013 season. For the first time, both schools were part of the same conference, and the rivalry resumed as a regular conference match beginning with the 2013 season.

Since 2013, the games have been scheduled for Thanksgiving weekend. In 2015, the game was played on Thanksgiving night, and in 2016, the game was played on the Saturday of that week,which will happen again for the 2022 meeting. However, in most years it has been scheduled for Black Friday, the day after Thanksgiving.

The 2022 football game was the last game scheduled between the teams because UCF left the American for the Big 12 Conference starting in 2023. As of now, no future games have been scheduled.

Game results
Since 2005, the Bulls and Knights have played fourteen times. The Knights lead the series, 8-6. The game has been played in two cities and three stadiums: Raymond James Stadium in Tampa, Florida, and Camping World Stadium and FBC Mortgage Stadium in Orlando, Florida. UCF holds a 8–2 series lead in conference games against USF.Bold dates indicate conference gamesItalic dates indicate games that count toward the trophy seriesMen's Basketball

The two schools began competing against one another in men's basketball during the 1971–72 season and have met 48 times to date. The Bulls currently hold a 27–19 edge over the Knights, however two Knights' victories were vacated due to NCAA sanctions, and UCF holds a 14–7 series lead since both teams joined the American Athletic Conference. USF and UCF are both tied for the longest win streaks in the series with the Bulls having won nine consecutive games against their rival from 1994 to 2007, while the Knights won nine straight from 2016 to 2020. The schools met in the postseason for the first time when they played in the first round of the 2022 American Athletic Conference tournament, which UCF won 60–58; they were scheduled to face each other in the first round of the 2020 edition before it was canceled less than an hour before tip-off due to the COVID-19 pandemic.Bold dates indicate conference gamesItalic dates indicate games that count toward the trophy seriesA 2022 American Athletic Conference tournament – First round

 Women's Basketball 

USF and UCF claim two different women's basketball records, due to when they declare the first meeting occurred. According to USF, they lead the women's basketball series 32–17, with the first meeting occurring on January 20, 1973, with a 41–30 Bulls win in Tampa. According to UCF, the first meeting occurred on January 12, 1978, with USF winning 81–70 in Tampa, resulting in a 29–14 USF lead in the series. South Florida has won two of the three times the schools met in the American Athletic Conference tournament (the 2018 semifinal and the 2021 championship game, with UCF winning in the 2022 championship game). The Bulls hold a 12–8 lead in conference play. In 2021, the Bulls and Knights were in first and second place in the conference respectively going into the final two games of the regular season, both of which were War on I-4 matchups. UCF needed to win both games to clinch the title, while USF only needed to win one. The Bulls beat the Knights in Tampa in the first game to win the conference championship. The Bulls beat the Knights again nine days later in the AAC Tournament championship game. They met again in the championship game the following season, where the Knights came away victorious. The Bulls also won the 2023 regular season AAC title in a win at UCF on February 15.

 Bold dates indicate conference gamesItalic dates indicate games that count toward the trophy seriesA 2018 American Athletic Conference tournament – SemifinalB 2021 American Athletic Conference tournament – Championship gameC 2022 American Athletic Conference tournament – Championship game

 Baseball 

The schools claim two different baseball records due to when they declare the first meeting occurred. According to USF, they lead the baseball series 79–77, with the first meeting occurring on March 13, 1971, with the Bulls winning 5–1 in Tampa. However, according to UCF the first meeting was FTU's 6–3 victory over USF on April 12, 1973 in Orlando, making the series a 76–76 tie. UCF has a 22–18 lead in the series since both teams have played in the same conference. 

It is by far the most-played sport between the two teams, with 156 (or 152 according to UCF) meetings. The two teams have played four times in the NCAA tournament (all of which coming in Regional play), splitting the games 2–2. Each team has won once head-to-head in the American Athletic Conference baseball tournament, with the Knights winning in the 2017 quarterfinal and the Bulls winning in the 2021 championship game. Bold dates indicate conference gamesItalic dates indicate games that count toward the trophy seriesA 1993 NCAA tournament – Regional second roundB 1997 NCAA tournament – Regional first roundC 2002 NCAA tournament – Regional first roundC 2002 NCAA tournament – Regional second roundE 2017 American Athletic Conference tournament – QuarterfinalF 2021 American Athletic Conference tournament – Championship game

Men's Soccer

USF and UCF claim different records in men's soccer, due to when they declare the first meeting occurred. USF claims the first meeting occurred in 1974 with USF winning 2–1, giving the Bulls a  lead. According to UCF the first meeting occurred in 1975 with USF winning 4–1, giving the Bulls a  lead. The sides have met in the NCAA tournament twice with each team winning one of those meetings. USF won the only meeting in the American Athletic Conference tournament and leads the series 8–5 for conference games as a whole.Bold dates indicate conference gamesItalic dates indicate games that count toward the trophy seriesA 2010 NCAA tournament – Regional first roundB 2011 NCAA tournament – Regional second roundC 2016 American Athletic Conference tournament – Semifinal

 Women's Soccer 

The first women's soccer meeting between the teams occurred in 1998 with USF winning 4–0 in Tampa. UCF currently leads the series , the best record of any of their teams against the Bulls. The schools have met in the American Athletic Conference tournament four times, with South Florida leading those matches . In the two tournament games that ended in ties, each side advanced on penalty kicks one of those times. The series is tied  in conference games between the schools.Bold dates indicate conference gamesItalic dates indicate games that count toward the trophy seriesA 2013 American Athletic Conference tournament – SemifinalB 2015 American Athletic Conference tournament – SemifinalC 2017 American Athletic Conference tournament – Championship gameD 2019 American Athletic Conference tournament – Semifinal

 Softball 

Softball was first played between the Bulls and then-Golden Knights on April 16, 2003, in a doubleheader in Tampa. USF won both games 9–0 and 5–4 respectively. The two schools have played each other in the NCAA tournament four times with USF holding a 3–1 lead while UCF won all three American Athletic Conference tournament meeting between the schools. Sara Nevins of USF threw the only no hitter in the series in the first game of a doubleheader on April 12, 2014, the first game where USF and UCF were in the same conference. USF and UCF are tied 19–19. UCF has a 17–10 lead since both teams joined the American.Bold dates indicate conference gamesItalic dates indicate games that count toward the trophy series†No Hitter

A 2005 NCAA tournament – Regional first roundB 2005 NCAA tournament – Regional second roundC 2008 NCAA tournament – Regional first roundD 2012 NCAA tournament – Regional first roundE 2015 American Athletic Conference tournament – SemifinalF 2021 American Athletic Conference tournament – SemifinalG 2022 American Athletic Conference tournament – Championship game

 Men's Tennis 

The first men's tennis match took place on February 10, 1978, with South Florida winning 5–4. Men's tennis is the Bulls most successful sport against UCF, with a 35–11 all-time series lead. The teams have met four times in the American Athletic Conference Men's Tennis tournament, with one meeting coming in the quarterfinal and three coming in the championship game. USF is 3–1 against UCF in these four meetings, and 2–1 in the championship games. The Bulls also lead the series 8–5 when playing the Knights in conference games.Bold dates indicate conference gamesItalic dates indicate games that count toward the trophy seriesA 2017 American Athletic Conference tournament – Championship gameB 2019 American Athletic Conference tournament – Championship gameC 2021 American Athletic Conference tournament – Championship gameD 2022 American Athletic Conference tournament – Quarterfinal

 Women's Tennis 

The women's tennis teams first played on February 23, 1994, with USF sweeping the Knights 9–0 in Tampa. UCF didn't win a game against South Florida until the ninth time the schools met. South Florida holds the all-time lead 20–10, but UCF has won three of the four times the schools met in the American Athletic Conference Women's Tennis Tournament, including the 2019 championship game. UCF leads the series 7–5 in conference games.Bold dates indicate conference gamesItalic dates indicate games that count toward the trophy seriesA 2015 American Athletic Conference tournament – First roundB 2019 American Athletic Conference tournament – Championship gameC 2021 American Athletic Conference tournament – QuarterfinalD 2022 American Athletic Conference tournament – Quarterfinal

 Volleyball 

USF and UCF disagree on their volleyball record, with the Bulls saying that they won the first meeting 2–1 in 1974 and UCF saying the first meeting was in 1976 with USF winning 2–0. According to USF, they lead the all-time series 49–45 while UCF claims that the Bulls lead 47–44. The Knights have never lost to USF as members of the American Athletic Conference with a 20–0 record in conference games against their rival.Bold dates indicate conference gamesItalic dates indicate games that count toward the trophy series'''

Postseason results
USF and UCF have met head-to-head 32 times in the postseason, with 22 meetings in conference tournaments (including nine conference championship games) and 10 in NCAA tournaments. The Bulls have a  overall postseason record against the Knights including a record of 6–4 in NCAA tournaments. The record in conference tournament games is tied . The Bulls have a better postseason head-to-head record in women's basketball (2–1; all in conference tournaments), men's soccer (2–1; 1–1 in NCAA tournaments and 1–0 in conference tournaments), women's soccer (all in conference tournaments), and men's tennis (3–1; all in conference tournaments). UCF leads in men's basketball (1–0; in a conference tournament), softball (4–3; though USF leads 3–1 in NCAA tournaments and UCF leads 3–0 in conference tournaments), and women's tennis (3–1; all in conference tournaments). They are tied in baseball (3–3; including 2–2 in NCAA tournaments and 1–1 in conference tournaments). In conference championship games specifically, USF leads , with championship game wins in baseball (2021), women's basketball (2021), and men's tennis (2017 and 2019), while UCF has beaten USF head-to-head for a conference title in women's basketball (2022), softball (2022), men's tennis (2021), and women's tennis (2019). The draw came in the 2017 women's soccer title game, which USF won 5–3 on penalty kicks (games that go to penalty kicks are officially listed as ties in NCAA records).

References

External links

 

College sports rivalries in the United States
South Florida Bulls
UCF Knights
1972 establishments in Florida
Sports rivalries in Florida